Liang Eng Hwa (born 1964) is a Singaporean politician and banker. A member of the governing People's Action Party (PAP), he has been the Member of Parliament representing Bukit Panjang SMC since 2020 and previously the Zhenghua division of Holland–Bukit Timah GRC between 2006 and 2020.

Education
Liang attended Bukit Panjang English School and Anderson Secondary School before graduating from Singapore Polytechnic in 1984 with a diploma in civil engineering.

He subsequently went on to complete a Bachelor of Commerce with first class honours degree at the University of Melbourne.

Career
Liang was a managing director at DBS Bank and a board member of the Urban Redevelopment Authority from 2009 to 2018.

Political career
Liang started serving as a Member of Parliament in 2006 after he joined a People's Action Party (PAP) team contesting in Holland–Bukit Timah GRC during the 2006 general election and the PAP team won by an uncontested walkover. During the 2011 general election, he joined a four-member PAP team contesting in Holland–Bukit Timah GRC again and won with 60.08% of the vote against the Singapore Democratic Party. Liang was declared as a Member of Parliament for his second term on 9 May 2011. He was also appointed chairman of the Finance, Trade & Industry Government Parliamentary Committee (GPC) in the 14th Parliament.

Personal life
Liang is a Buddhist.

References

External links
 Liang Eng Hwa on Parliament of Singapore
 

1964 births
Living people
Singaporean people of Hokkien descent
Members of the Parliament of Singapore
University of Melbourne alumni
Place of birth missing (living people)
Singaporean Buddhists